Henry Goldney may refer to:

Henry Goldney alias Fernell, MP
 Sir Henry Goldney, 4th Baronet (1886–1974), World War I soldier